Statistics of UAE Football League in season 1986/87.

Overview
Sharjah FC won the championship.

League standings

References
United Arab Emirates - List of final tables (RSSSF)

UAE Pro League seasons
United
1986–87 in Emirati football